FIBA All-Star Games were all-star basketball exhibition games, which were also known as "FIBA Festivals". The "FIBA Festival All-Star Games" were held from 1964 to 1995. The FIBA European Selection teams won most of the FIBA Festival All-Star Games, with an overall record of 24–5. The FIBA Festival All-Star Game event was eventually replaced by the FIBA EuroStars All-Star Game event, in 1996. The FIBA EuroStars All-Star Game was last held in 1999.

Awards and selection criteria
The FIBA Festival All-Star Games featured the "FIBA European Selection" teams. Being chosen for the FIBA European Selection Team was the highest individual honor for a European club player at the time. The all-star games pitted the players of the European Selection teams, against various club teams, national teams, and non-European-wide all-star team selections. Only the players that were chosen to the FIBA European Selection teams were credited with having All-European Club Team honors. While all of the players that participated in each of the all-star games, from both teams, were credited as having all-star game appearances.

Originally, the first five FIBA European Selection teams (1964, 1965, 1966, 1967, and 1968), were selected from among the players of the European-wide top-tier level FIBA European Champions Cup (FIBA EuroLeague). However, starting with the 1969 All-Star Game event, the FIBA European Selection team players were chosen from among the players from all of the club leagues in Europe. Over the years, most of the all-star game's FIBA European Selection team players, came from what were the three major European-wide professional club basketball leagues at the time, the aforementioned top-tier level FIBA EuroLeague, the second-tier level FIBA European Cup (FIBA Saporta Cup), and the third-tier level FIBA Korać Cup. In addition to talent, skills, and performance, diversity was also paramount in choosing the players of the FIBA European Selection teams, which aimed at allowing for several different European national basketball schools to be represented at the all-star games. 

After the FIBA Festival All-Star Game was last held in 1995, it was replaced in 1996, by the FIBA EuroStars event. The FIBA EuroStars was a normal all-star game selection award for the players that competed in it. Being chosen to one of the FIBA EuroStars game's teams did not give a player a separate individual All-European Club Team award, like being named a member of the FIBA European Selection Team did with the FIBA Festival All-Star Games.

In 2001, what was the equivalent of a FIBA European Selection Team award was introduced with the EuroLeague's All-EuroLeague Team award. As the All-EuroLeague Team also honors the top European selection of club team players into a list of ten players. However, unlike the FIBA Festival All-Star Game's European Selection Team, the EuroLeague's All-EuroLeague Team selection does not include an all-star game event featuring the players.

FIBA All-Star Games 1964–1995

Games organized by FIBA (FIBA Festivals)

I

15.10.1965 (Kraków, Poland) 
 European Selection  vs.  Real Madrid: 101–83

15.10.1965 (Kraków, Poland)  Real Madrid vs. Wisła Krakow : 70–85

16.10.1965 (Kraków, Poland) 
 European Selection  vs.  Wisła Kraków: 70–78

Wisła Kraków: Bohdan Likszo, Edward Grzywna, Krystian Czernichowski, Ryszard Niewodowski, Jacek Pietrzyk, Jan Piotrowski, Andrzej Baron, Andrzej Guzik, Stefan Wójcik, Czesław Malec, Tadeusz Michałowski, Wiesław Langiewicz. Head Coach: Jerzy Bętkowski

FIBA European Selection roster: Tani Cohen-Mintz (Israel), Radivoj Korać (Yugoslavia), Trajko Rajković (Yugoslavia), Sauro Bufalini (Italy), Giambattista Cescutti (Italy), Massimo Villetti (Italy), František Konvička (Czechoslovakia), Vladimir Pistelak (Czechoslovakia), Jan Bobrovský (Czechoslovakia), Henri Grange (France), Georgios Trontzos (Greece), Martti Liimo (Finland). Head Coaches: Miloslav Kříž (Czechoslovakia) & Nello Paratore (Italy)

II

14.6.1968 (Belgrade, Yugoslavia) 
 European Selection  vs.  Real Madrid: 72–56

16.6.1968 (Belgrade, Yugoslavia) 
 European Selection  vs.  Crvena Zvezda: 96–79

FIBA European Selection roster: Krešimir Ćosić (Yugoslavia), Josip Giuseppe "Pino" Djerdja (Yugoslavia), Francisco "Nino" Buscato (Spain), František Konvička (Czechoslovakia), Vladimir Pistelak (Czechoslovakia), Massimo Masini (Italy), 
Boleslaw Kwiatkowski (Poland), Veikko Vainio (Finland), Ivan Vodenicharski (Bulgaria), Lucien Michelet (Belgium). Head Coaches: Miloslav Kříž (Czechoslovakia) & Witold Zagórski (Poland)

III

20.11.1969 (Belgrade, Yugoslavia) 
 European Selection  vs.  Yugoslavia: 93–90

FIBA European Selection roster: Sergei Belov (USSR), Gennadi Volnov (USSR), Modestas Paulauskas (USSR), Emiliano Rodríguez (Spain), Clifford Luyk (Spain), Francisco "Nino" Buscato (Spain), Jiří Zedníček (Czechoslovakia), Robert Mifka (Czechoslovakia), Mieczysław Łopatka (Poland), Mincho Dimov (Bulgaria). Head Coach: Witold Zagórski (Poland)

IV

10.6.1970 (Athens, Greece) 
 European Selection  vs.  Ignis Varèse: 88–72

12.6.1970 (Athens, Greece) 
 European Selection  vs.  Fides Napoli: 85–92 (overtime)

14.6.1970 (Athens, Greece) 
 European Selection  vs.  AEK: 100–74

FIBA European Selection roster: Krešimir Ćosić (Yugoslavia), Nikola Plećaš (Yugoslavia), Ljubodrag Simonović (Yugoslavia), Dragutin Čermak (Yugoslavia), Dragan Kapičić (Yugoslavia), Clifford Luyk (Spain), Francisco "Nino" Buscato (Spain), Vicente Ramos (Spain), Massimo Masini (Italy), Georgios Kolokithas (Greece). Head Coaches: Witold Zagórski (Poland) & Faidon Matthaiou (Greece)

V

5.6.1971 (Rome, Italy) 
 European Selection  vs.  Italy: 96–64

FIBA European Selection roster: Krešimir Ćosić (Yugoslavia), Petar Skansi (Yugoslavia), Ljubodrag Simonović (Yugoslavia), Sergei Belov (USSR), Alexander Belov (USSR), Modestas Paulauskas (USSR), Clifford Luyk (Spain), Francisco "Nino" Buscato (Spain), Jiří Zedníček (Czechoslovakia), Edward Jurkiewicz (Poland), Grzegorz Korcz (Poland). Head Coach: Witold Zagórski (Poland)

VI

17.6.1972 (Zagreb, Yugoslavia) 
 European Selection  vs.  USA: 102–75

19.6.1972 (Geneva, Switzerland) 
 European Selection  vs.  USA: 88–61

21.6.1972 (Vigo, Spain)
 European Selection  vs.  USA: 78–64

23.6.1972 (Le Touquet, France) 
 European Selection  vs.  USA: 99–85

FIBA European Selection roster: Krešimir Ćosić (Yugoslavia), Nikola Plećaš (Yugoslavia), Ljubodrag Simonović (Yugoslavia), Sergei Belov (USSR), Alexander Belov (USSR), Modestas Paulauskas (USSR), Alzhan Zharmukhamedov (USSR), Ivan Edeshko (USSR), Clifford Luyk (Spain), Jiří Zedníček (Czechoslovakia), Ottorino Flaborea (Italy), Georgi Khristov (Bulgaria). Head Coach: Witold Zagórski (Poland)

VII

14.6.1973 (Badalona, Spain)
 European Selection  vs.  Juventud Schweppes: 107–97

16.6.1973 (Barcelona, Spain) 
 European Selection  vs.  Real Madrid: 95–98

FIBA European Selection roster: Krešimir Ćosić (Yugoslavia), Vinko Jelovac (Yugoslavia), Rato Tvrdić (Yugoslavia), Emiliano Rodríguez (Spain), Francisco "Nino" Buscato (Spain), Dino Meneghin (Italy), Massimo Masini (Italy), Ivan Edeshko (USSR), Jean-Pierre Staelens (France), Andrzej Seweryn (Poland). Head Coaches: Witold Zagórski (Poland) & Faidon Matthaiou (Greece)

VIII

26.9.1974 (Rio de Janeiro, Brazil) 
 European Selection  vs.  Americas All-Stars: 94–85

28.9.1974 (São Paulo, Brazil) 
 European Selection  vs.  Americas All-Stars: 103–99

1.10.1974 (Brussels, Belgium) 
 European Selection  vs.  Americas All-Stars: 103–90

4.10.1974 (Rome, Italy) 
 European Selection  vs.  Americas All-Stars: 85–87

FIBA European Selection roster: Dino Meneghin (Italy), Pierlo Marzorati (Italy), Sergei Belov (USSR), Krešimir Ćosić (Yugoslavia), Vinko Jelovac (Yugoslavia), Damir Šolman (Yugoslavia), Wayne Brabender (Spain), Luis Miguel Santillana (Spain), Jacques Cachemire (France), Vassilis Goumas (Greece). Head Coach: Giancarlo Primo (Italy)

IX

22.6.1975 (Tel Aviv, Israel) 
 European Selection  vs.  Maccabi Tel Aviv: 115–88

FIBA European Selection roster: Dino Meneghin (Italy), Pierlo Marzorati (Italy), Renzo Bariviera (Italy), Ivan Bisson (Italy), Wayne Brabender (Spain), Luis Miguel Santillana (Spain), Carmelo Cabrera (Spain), Jacques Cachemire (France), Etienne Geerts (Belgium), Imre Nytrai (Belgium). Head Coach: Giancarlo Primo (Italy)

X

15.9.1976 (Cairo, Egypt) 
 European Selection  vs.  Egypt: 97–71

17.9.1976 (Cairo, Egypt) 
 European Selection  vs.  Egypt: 118–80

FIBA European Selection roster: Dragan Kićanović (Yugoslavia), Zoran Slavnić (Yugoslavia), Željko Jerkov (Yugoslavia), Juan Antonio Corbalán (Spain), Wayne Brabender (Spain), Luis Miguel Santillana (Spain), Rafael Rullán (Spain), Pierlo Marzorati (Italy), Ivan Bisson (Italy), Renzo Bariviera (Italy). Head Coach: Giancarlo Primo (Italy)

XI

3.5.1977 (Split, Yugoslavia) 
 European Selection  vs.  Jugoplastika Split: 116–108

FIBA European Selection roster: Pierlo Marzorati (Italy), Fabrizio Della Fiori (Italy), Gianni Bertolotti (Italy), Renzo Bariviera (Italy), Juan Antonio Corbalán (Spain), Rafael Rullán (Spain), Manuel Flores (Spain), Kamil Brabenec (Czechoslovakia), Zdenek Kos (Czechoslovakia), Atanas Golomeev (Bulgaria), Etienne Geerts (Belgium). Head Coach: Antonio Díaz-Miguel (Spain)

XII

2.7.1978 (Madrid, Spain) 
 European Selection  vs.  Real Madrid: 102–119

FIBA European Selection roster: Mirza Delibašić (Yugoslavia), Dražen Dalipagić (Yugoslavia), Dragan Kićanović (Yugoslavia), Željko Jerkov (Yugoslavia), Dino Meneghin (Italy), Renzo Bariviera (Italy), Lorenzo Carraro (Italy), Miki Berkovich (Israel), Tal Brody (Israel), Kamil Brabenec (Czechoslovakia), Luis Miguel Santillana (Spain). Head Coach: Antonio Díaz-Miguel (Spain)

XIII

26.6.1979 (Prievidza, Czechoslovakia) 
 European Selection  vs.  Czechoslovakia: 99–89

28.6.1979 (Bratislava, Czechoslovakia) 
 European Selection  vs.  Czechoslovakia: 82–79

FIBA European Selection roster: Vladimir Tkachenko (USSR), Anatoli Myshkin (USSR), Alexander Belostenny (USSR), Stanislav Yeryomin (USSR), Wayne Brabender (Spain), Juan Antonio Corbalán (Spain), Rafael Rullán (Spain), Ratko Radovanović (Yugoslavia), Jacques Cachemire (France), Carlo Caglieris (Italy), Lorenzo Carraro (Italy). Head Coach: Aca Nikolić (Yugoslavia)

XIV

7.6.1981 (Kraków, Poland) 
 European Selection  vs.  Wisła Kraków: 121–81

Wisła Kraków: Zbigniew Kudłacz, Jerzy Bińkowski, Wojciech Rosiński, Piotr Wielebnowski, Janusz Seweryn, Andrzej Seweryn, Stanisław Zgłobicki, Marek Żochowski, Mieczysław Młynarski, Zbigniew Bogucki, Jacek Międzik, Krzysztof Fikiel. Trener: Jan Mikułowski

FIBA European Selection roster: Mirza Delibašić (Yugoslavia), Dražen Dalipagić (Yugoslavia), Dragan Kićanović (Yugoslavia), Pierlo Marzorati (Italy), Renato Villalta (Italy), Juan Antonio Corbalán (Spain), Rafael Rullán (Spain), Juan Domingo de la Cruz (Spain), Stano Kropilák (Czechoslovakia), Zdenek Kos (Czechoslovakia), Stanislav Yeryomin (USSR), Éric Beugnot (France). Head Coach: Antonio Díaz-Miguel (Spain)

XV

18.6.1982 (Geneva, Switzerland) 
 European Selection  vs.  USA: 111–92

20.6.1982 (Budapest, Hungary) 
 European Selection  vs.  USA: 103–88

FIBA European Selection roster: Dražen Dalipagić (Yugoslavia), Željko Jerkov (Yugoslavia), Vladimir Tkachenko (USSR), Anatoli Myshkin (USSR), Pierlo Marzorati (Italy), Juan Antonio San Epifanio "Epi" (Spain), Juan Antonio Corbalán (Spain), 
Juan Domingo De la Cruz (Spain), Miki Berkovich (Israel), Stano Kropilák (Czechoslovakia), Arpad Losonczy (Hungary). Head Coach: Antonio Díaz-Miguel (Spain)

Other FIBA All-Star exhibition games

I

(In honor of Real Madrid's first FIBA European Champions Cup (EuroLeague) title)

17.5.1964 (Palacio de Deportes, Madrid, Spain) 
 European Selection  -  Real Madrid: 91–87

Real Madrid: #4 Ignacio San Martín, #5 José Ramón Durand, #6 Julio Descartín, #7 Manuel Sainz Marquez, #9 Antonio Palermo Romero, #10 Emiliano Rodríguez, #11 Carlos Sevilliano, #12 Williams Hanson, #13 Clifford Luyk, #14 Robert Burgess, #15 Jose Manuel Menche. Trainer: Joaquim Hernandez

FIBA European Selection roster: Radivoj Korać (Yugoslavia), Miodrag Nikolić (Yugoslavia), Slobodan Gordić (Yugoslavia), Sandro Riminucci (Italy), Gabriele Vianello (Italy), Paolo Vittori (Italy), Gianfranco Pieri (Italy), Andrzej Pstrokonski (Poland), Janusz Wichowski (Poland), Roger Antoine (France), Tani Cohen-Mintz (Israel), Jozef "Jef" Eygel (Belgium). Head Coaches: Miloslav Kříž (Czechoslovakia) & Robert Busnel (France)

II

13.10.1966 (Ljubljana, Yugoslavia)
 European Selection  -  Simmenthal Milano: 89–91

15.10.1966 (Ljubljana, Yugoslavia)
 European Selection  -  AŠK Olimpija: 102–94

FIBA European Selection roster: Emiliano Rodríguez (Spain), Carlos Sevillano (Spain), Jiří Zídek Sr. (Czechoslovakia), Jiří Zedníček (Czechoslovakia), Jiri Ammer (Czechoslovakia), Jean Degros (France), Christos Zoupas (Greece), Willy Steveniers (Belgium), John Loridon (Belgium), Mihai Albu (Romania), Cvjatko Barchovski (Bulgaria), Bohdan Likszo (Poland). Head Coaches: Miloslav Kříž (Czechoslovakia) & Robert Busnel (France)

III

1.11.1967 (Antwerp, Belgium) 
 European Selection  -  Real Madrid: 124–97

3.11.1967 (Antwerp, Belgium) 
 European Selection  -  Bell Mechelen: 112–101

FIBA European Selection roster: Ivo Daneu (Yugoslavia), Borut Bassin (Yugoslavia), Massimo Masini (Italy), Jiří Zídek Sr. (Czechoslovakia), Jiří Zedníček (Czechoslovakia), Bohumil Tomasek (Czechoslovakia), Jiri Ruzicka (Czechoslovakia), 
Georgios Trontzos (Greece), Jorma Pilkevaara (Finland), Alin Savu (Romania), Wlodzimierz Trams (Poland). Head Coaches: Miloslav Kříž (Czechoslovakia) & Robert Busnel (France) & Witold Zagórski (Poland)

IV

(Tal Brody's farewell game)

4.9.1980 (Tel Aviv, Israel) 
 European Selection  -  Maccabi Tel Aviv: 92–93

FIBA European Selection roster: Juan Antonio San Epifanio "Epi" (Spain), Juan Antonio Corbalán (Spain), Wayne Brabender (Spain), Juan Domingo de la Cruz (Spain), Dino Meneghin (Italy), Renato Villalta (Italy), Fabrizio Della Fiori (Italy), Panagiotis Giannakis (Greece), Hervé Dubuisson (France), Klaus Zander (Germany). Head Coach: Lolo Sainz (Spain)

V

5.9.1981 (Ankara, Turkey) 
 European Selection  -  Turkey: 121–106

9.9.1981 (Badalona, Spain) 
 European Selection  -  Joventut Sony: 125–120

22.9.1981 (Caserta, Italy) 
 European Selection  -  Soviet Union: 64–90

FIBA European Selection roster: Dražen Dalipagić (Yugoslavia), Mirza Delibašić (Yugoslavia), Juan Antonio Corbalán (Spain), Juan Domingo de la Cruz (Spain), Rafael Rullán (Spain), Miki Berkovich (Israel), Lou Silver (Israel), Stano Kropilák (Czechoslovakia), Mieczysław Młynarski (Poland), Efe Aydan (Turkey), Éric Beugnot (France). Head Coach: Antonio Díaz-Miguel (Spain)

VI

17.7.1987 (Tel Aviv, Israel) (Lou Silver's farewell game) 
 European Selection  -  Maccabi Tel Aviv: 108–87

19.7.1987 (Thessaloniki, Greece) 
 European Selection  -  Greece: 109–101

21.7.1987 (Sofia, Bulgaria) 
 European Selection  -  Bulgaria: 129–82

FIBA European Selection roster: Dražen Petrović (Yugoslavia), Stojko Vranković (Yugoslavia), Nikos Galis (Greece), Panagiotis Giannakis (Greece), Antonello Riva (Italy), Walter Magnifico (Italy), Miki Berkovich (Israel), Doron Jamchi (Israel), Richard Dacoury (France), Stano Kropilák (Czechoslovakia), Rik Smits (Netherlands). Head Coach: Pavel Petera (Czechoslovakia)

VII

27.12.1990 (Split, Yugoslavia) 
 European Selection  -  Pop 84 Split: 104–102

FIBA European Selection roster: Panagiotis Giannakis (Greece), Panagiotis Fasoulas (Greece), Doron Jamchi (Israel), Jordi Villacampa (Spain), José Montero (Spain), Andro Knego (Yugoslavia), Jure Zdovc (Yugoslavia), Stéphane Ostrowski (France), Stefano Rusconi (Italy). Head Coach: Aíto García Reneses ("Aíto") (Spain)

VIII

8.6.1991 (Piraeus, Greece) 
 European Selection  -  Balkans Selection: 102–103

FIBA European Selection roster: Juan Antonio San Epifanio "Epi" (Spain), Jordi Villacampa (Spain), Antonio Martín (Spain), Antonello Riva (Italy), Walter Magnifico (Italy), Roberto Brunamonti (Italy), Richard Dacoury (France), Stéphane Ostrowski (France), Philip Szanyiel (France), Sergei Bazarevich (Russia), Igors Miglinieks (Latvia), Andrejs Bondarenko (Latvia). Head Coach: Sandro Gamba (Italy)

FIBA Balkans Selection roster: Toni Kukoč (Yugoslavia), Dino Rađja (Yugoslavia), Žarko Paspalj (Yugoslavia), Jure Zdovc (Yugoslavia), Zoran Savić (Yugoslavia), Nikos Galis (Greece), Panagiotis Giannakis (Greece), Panagiotis Fasoulas (Greece), Fanis Christodoulou (Greece), Georgi Glouchkov (Bulgaria). Head Coach: Kostas Politis (Greece)

IX

12.9.1991 (Cantù, Italy) 
 European Selection  -  Clear Cantù: 144–115

27.12.1991 (Paris, France) 
 European Selection  -  France: 102–83

FIBA European Selection roster: Toni Kukoč (Croatia), Žarko Paspalj (Yugoslavia), Dino Rađja (Croatia), Jure Zdovc (Slovenia), Oscar Schmidt (Brazil), Antonello Riva (Italy), Walter Magnifico (Italy), Nando Gentile (Italy), Richard Dacoury (France), Antoine Rigaudeau (France), Stéphane Ostrowski (France), Doron Jamchi (Israel), Panagiotis Fasoulas (Greece). Head Coach: Sandro Gamba (Italy)

X

(Juan Antonio San Epifanio "Epi"'s farewell game)

26.12.1995 (Barcelona, Spain) 
 European Selection  -  FC Barcelona: 118–92

FIBA European Selection roster: Jordi Villacampa (Spain), Alberto Herreros (Spain), Rafa Jofresa (Spain), José Antúnez (Spain), Stéphane Ostrowski (France), Doron Jamchi (Israel), Teo Alibegović (Slovenia), Andrei Fetisov (Russia), Mikhail Mikhailov (Russia), Gus Binelli (Italy). Head Coach: Mirko Novosel (Croatia)

XI

(Miki Berkovich's farewell game)

28.12.1995 (Tel Aviv, Israel) 
 European Selection  -  Maccabi Tel Aviv: 120–89

FIBA European Selection roster: Artūras Karnišovas (Lithuania), Sergei Bazarevich (Russia), Teo Alibegović (Slovenia), Panagiotis Fasoulas (Greece), Stéphane Ostrowski (France), Sašha Obradović (Yugoslavia), Georgios Sigalas (Greece), Veljko Mršić (Croatia), Evgeni Kisurin (Russia), Ronny Bayer (Belgium). Head Coach: Mirko Novosel (Croatia)

Players with multiple selections
Player nationalities by national team.

By head coach

See also
FIBA EuroStars
FIBA EuroLeague All-Final Four Team
All-EuroLeague Team
FIBA EuroCup All-Star Day

External links
The European All Star Tradition

European basketball awards
Defunct basketball competitions in Europe
International club basketball competitions
Basketball all-star games